Corston is a small village and civil parish close to the River Avon and situated on the A39 road in the Bath and North East Somerset unitary authority, Somerset, England. The parish has a population of 494.

History

The parish of Corston was part of the Wellow Hundred.

Governance

The parish council has responsibility for local issues, including setting an annual precept (local rate) to cover the council’s operating costs and producing annual accounts for public scrutiny. The parish council evaluates local planning applications and works with the local police, district council officers, and neighbourhood watch groups on matters of crime, security, and traffic. The parish council's role also includes initiating projects for the maintenance and repair of parish facilities, such as the village hall or community centre, playing fields and playgrounds, as well as consulting with the district council on the maintenance, repair, and improvement of highways, drainage, footpaths, public transport, and street cleaning. Conservation matters (including trees and listed buildings) and environmental issues are also of interest to the council.

The parish falls within the unitary authority of Bath and North East Somerset which was created in 1996, as established by the Local Government Act 1992. It provides a single tier of local government with responsibility for almost all local government functions within its area including local planning and building control, local roads, council housing, environmental health, markets and fairs, refuse collection, recycling, cemeteries, crematoria, leisure services, parks, and tourism. It is also responsible for education, social services, libraries, main roads, public transport, trading standards, waste disposal and strategic planning, although fire, police and ambulance services are provided jointly with other authorities through the Avon Fire and Rescue Service, Avon and Somerset Constabulary and the Great Western Ambulance Service.

Bath and North East Somerset's area covers part of the ceremonial county of Somerset but it is administered independently of the non-metropolitan county. Its administrative headquarters are in Bath. Between 1 April 1974 and 1 April 1996, the parish was in the District of Wansdyke within the County of Avon. Before 1974 it was part of Bathavon Rural District.

The parish is represented in the House of Commons of the Parliament of the United Kingdom as part of North East Somerset. It elects one Member of Parliament (MP) by the first past the post system of election. It was also part of the South West England constituency of the European Parliament prior to Britain leaving the European Union in January 2020, which elected seven MEPs using the d'Hondt method of party-list proportional representation.

Religious sites

All Saints' Church dates from the 12th century and is a grade II listed building. The bells in its bell tower are regularly utilized for change ringing.

It is within the benefice of Farmborough, Marksbury and Stanton Prior, Corston and Newton St Loe, and in the Archdeaconry of Bath.

Transport
Bus services connect Corston with Bath, Keynsham and Bristol. The Saltford Environment Group is campaigning to reopen the nearby Saltford railway station on the Bath–Bristol line, which was closed in 1970.

References

External links

Civil parishes in Somerset
Villages in Bath and North East Somerset